John Buell Snyder (July 30, 1877 – February 24, 1946) was a Democratic Party member of the U.S. House of Representatives from Pennsylvania.

J. Buell Snyder was born on a farm in Upper Turkeyfoot Township, Pennsylvania. He attended summer sessions of Harvard University, and Columbia University in New York City. He graduated from the Lock Haven Teachers College in Lock Haven, Pennsylvania.

He worked as principal of schools at Stoystown, Rockwood, and Berlin in Somerset County, Pennsylvania, from 1901 to 1906, and of Perry Township Union High School from 1906 to 1912.

He was the western Pennsylvania manager for an educational publisher from 1912 to 1932, and a member of the board of education of Perry Township in Pennsylvania, from 1922 to 1932. He was legislative representative for Pennsylvania school directors during sessions of the Pennsylvania General Assembly from 1921 to 1923, and a member of the National Commission of One Hundred for Study and Survey of Rural Schools in the United States from 1922 to 1924.

Snyder was elected from the 24th District of Pennsylvania as a Democrat to the Seventy-third and to the six succeeding Congresses and served from March 4, 1933, until his death in Pittsburgh, aged 69.

See also
 List of United States Congress members who died in office (1900–49)

Sources

The Political Graveyard

External links 
 

1877 births
1946 deaths
Harvard Summer School alumni
Columbia University alumni
Lock Haven University of Pennsylvania alumni
American school principals
People from Somerset County, Pennsylvania
School board members in Pennsylvania
Democratic Party members of the United States House of Representatives from Pennsylvania